Erik Aadahl (born September 16, 1976) is an American sound editor. He is best known for providing Godzilla's roar in the 2014 film of the same name. He also voiced Bumblebee in Transformers: The Last Knight.

Career 
He graduated from the University of Southern California's School of Cinematic Arts in 1998. He was supervising sound editor on Transformers: Dark of the Moon, for which he was nominated for an Academy Award. Aadahl notably worked on Godzilla's "roar" for the 2014 Godzilla film and voiced Bumblebee in Transformers: The Last Knight. He was the sound editor for A Quiet Place alongside Ethan Van der Ryn.

References

External links

1976 births
Living people
American sound editors
USC School of Cinematic Arts alumni
American people of Norwegian descent